Agyneta palgongsanensis is a species of sheet weaver found in China, Korea and Russia. It was described by Paik in 1991.

References

palgongsanensis
Spiders described in 1991
Spiders of Asia
Spiders of Russia